The 2019 IAAF Combined Events Challenge was the 22nd edition of the global series of combined track and field event meetings organised by the International Association of Athletics Federations (IAAF). It featured decathlon for men and heptathlon for women. A total of eleven meetings were in the 2019 series, starting at the Multistars meet on 27 April and finishing at the 2019 World Athletics Championships on 4 October.

Athletes scored points based on their performances at meetings in the series, with the overall winners being the athletes with the highest aggregate score over three meetings. The total prize money was US$202,000, split evenly between male and female athletes. The male and female winners each received $30,000, while second and third placed athletes were entitled to $20,000 and $15,000 respectively. Smaller prizes were given to the rest of the top eight finishers. The overall winners were Damian Warner of Canada with 25,753 points in the decathlon and Austrian Verena Preiner with 19,623 points in the heptathlon.

Calendar
The 2019 challenge included eleven meetings, covering invitational meetings, as well as national, regional and international championships and games.

Results

Men

Women

Points rankings
The following are the rankings of all athletes who competed at three series meets or more.

Men

Women

References

Rankings
2019 Standing Men IAAF Combined Events Challenge. World Athletics. Retrieved 2019-11-17.
2019 Standing Women IAAF Combined Events Challenge. World Athletics. Retrieved 2019-11-17.

2019
Combined Events Challenge